Thermocrinis albus is a bacterium. Its type strain is HI 11/12 (DSM 14484, JCM 11386).

References

Further reading
Dworkin, Martin, and Stanley Falkow, eds. The Prokaryotes: Vol. 7: Proteobacteria: Delta and Epsilon Subclasses. Deeply Rooting Bacteria. Vol. 7. Springer, 2006.

External links 
LPSN

Type strain of Thermocrinis albus at BacDive -  the Bacterial Diversity Metadatabase

Aquificota
Bacteria described in 2002